Al-Jabalyn is a sub-district located in Al Udayn District, Ibb Governorate, Yemen. Al-Jabalyn had a population of 11,882 as of 2004.

References 

Sub-districts in Al Udayn District